Brotterode-Trusetal is a town in the Schmalkalden-Meiningen district, in Thuringia, Germany. It was named after the town Brotterode and the German river Truse that flows through the municipality. It was formed on 1 December 2011 by the merger of the former municipalities Brotterode and Trusetal.

References

Schmalkalden-Meiningen